James Owusu-Ansah (born December 2, 1981) is a Ghanaian former footballer who last played for Luis Ángel Firpo in the Primera División de Fútbol de El Salvador.

Biography

In 2007, Owusu-Ansah, Gil and Zè Raimundo were selected by the Chapecoense's football manager Ribeiro among 30 players, but in the middle of the following season the Ghanese midfielder left his team and moved to Guatemala to join Xelajú MC.

International career
Owusu-Ansah played four matches for silver medal-winning Ghana at the 2001 FIFA World Youth Championship.

Honours
FIFA World Youth Championship: Runner-up
 2001

References

External links
 
 
  

1981 births
Living people
Footballers from Accra
Ghanaian footballers
Ghana under-20 international footballers
Ghanaian expatriate footballers
Cruz Azul footballers
Chiapas F.C. footballers
Aurora F.C. players
Once Municipal footballers
Associação Chapecoense de Futebol players
Xelajú MC players
C.D. Atlético Marte footballers
Correcaminos UAT footballers
Expatriate footballers in Mexico
Expatriate footballers in Guatemala
Expatriate footballers in El Salvador
Expatriate footballers in Brazil
Ghanaian expatriate sportspeople in Brazil
Ghanaian expatriate sportspeople in El Salvador
Ghanaian expatriate sportspeople in Guatemala
Ghanaian expatriate sportspeople in Mexico
Association football forwards